Michael Shippley (born 30 June 1992) is an Australian Paralympic cyclist who won a bronze medal at 2022 World Para Track Championships.

Personal
Shippley was born 30 June 1998. In 2014, he had a motorbike accident which resulted in a left common perennial nerve palsy (foot drop) and multi ligament damage to his left knee. Shippley completed an engineering degree at Griffith University in 2020 and then commenced an exercise physiology degree. In 2019, he was awarded Full Blue Sporting Award at Griffith University.

Cycling
Prior to his motorbike accident, participated in triathlon and Olympic weightlifting. He is classified as C5 cyclist.

At the 2019  2019 Para-cycling Track World Championships, he finished 13th in the Men's Time Trial C5 and 4th in the Team Sprint C1-5. He missed selection for the 2020 Toyko Paralympics. 

At the 2022 UCI Para-cycling Track World Championships in  Saint-Quentin-en-Yvelines, France, he won the bronze medal in the Mixed Team Sprint C1-5 and finished 5th in the Men's Time Trial C5.

In 2022, he is a member of the Balmoral Cycling Club and a Queensland Academy of Sport scholarship athlete.

References

Paralympic cyclists of Australia
1992 births
Living people
Australian male cyclists
Griffith University alumni